Bakas, also spelled Bakkas, is a village in Gosainganj block of Lucknow district, Uttar Pradesh, India. As of 2011, its population is 8,171, in 1,444 households. It is the seat of a gram panchayat.

History 
Around the turn of the 20th century, Bakas was described as "a considerable village" in the northern part of the pargana of Mohanlalganj, with a population of 2,200. The lands belonging to the village stretched northward to the bank of the Gomti River; they were extensively cultivated, with loamy soil and irrigation provided from tanks and wells. Bakas hosted a weekly market, and it was held in zamindari tenure by the Janwars of Mau.

References 

Villages in Lucknow district